Siu Hei is an MTR Light Rail stop in Hong Kong located at ground level at Wu On Street between Siu Hei Court and Yuet Wu Villa, in Tuen Mun District. It began service on 17 November 1991 and belongs to Zone 1. It serves Siu Hei Court, Yuet Wu Villa and Wu King Estate.

MTR Light Rail stops
Former Kowloon–Canton Railway stations
Tuen Mun District
Railway stations in Hong Kong opened in 1991
1991 establishments in Hong Kong
MTR Light Rail stops named from housing estates